Elaine Marzola is an American politician currently serving in the Nevada Assembly from Nevada's 21st district. She was elected to the seat after incumbent Democrat Ozzie Fumo decided to run for Nevada Supreme Court instead of reelection. She won election in 2020, defeating Republican Cherlyn Arrington, winning 52% to 48%.

References

Living people
American people of Brazilian descent
American politicians of Brazilian descent
Brazilian emigrants to the United States
Democratic Party members of the Nevada Assembly
Hispanic and Latino American state legislators in Nevada
Hispanic and Latino American women in politics
21st-century American politicians
Year of birth missing (living people)